New acoustic music is a music genre that blends influences from folk, bluegrass, jazz and world music and uses only acoustic instruments.  Beginning in the 1970s, it has been developed by artists such as Béla Fleck, Leo Kottke, Tim Ware, Tony Rice, Mike Marshall, Darol Anger and others.

See also
American primitive guitar
Folk baroque

Notes

References
Neil V. Rosenberg (1992) Review: From the Sound Recordings Review Editor: Bluegrass Today The Journal of American Folklore, Vol. 105, No. 418,  pp. 458–470
Adam Stetson (2006) Expressing Identity in Colorado Bluegrass Music Sub-Culture: Negotiating Modernity in the American West through Music, Humor and Shared Experience.University of Colorado 
Phil Hood (1986) Artists of American folk music : the legends of traditional folk, the stars of the sixties, the virtuosi of new acoustic music. New York : Quill, ©1986.

Music genres
Contemporary folk subgenres